Gymnastics was contested at the 1994 Asian Games in Hiroshima Sun Plaza, Hiroshima, Japan. Artistic gymnastics took place from October 3 to October 6. Rhythmic gymnastics took place on October 9 and 10.

Medalists

Men's artistic

Women's artistic

Rhythmic

Medal table

References 

 New Straits Times, October 3–11, 1994
Results
Men's Results
Women's Results

External links 
 Olympic Council of Asia

 
1994 Asian Games events
1994
Asian Games
1994 Asian Games